XXX (pronounced "triple x") is the twelfth studio album by British rock band Asia, released in 2012. It is the fifth and final studio album with the original line-up due to guitarist Steve Howe's departure the following year and vocalist/bassist John Wetton's death in 2017.

XXX was released on CD, special edition CD/DVD-Video (featuring bonus tracks, new music videos and the making of the album) and LP. To promote the album, "Face on the Bridge" was made available as a digital download single and a music video on 14 May 2012.

Production
The recording sessions took place from January to March 2012 at Liscombe Park Studios, located in Buckinghamshire countryside west of Bedfordshire town Leighton Buzzard, where Asia had worked on their two previous albums. XXX was produced by Mike Paxman and engineered by Steve Rispin. The cover artwork was designed by Roger Dean, who had collaborated with Asia since their first album, released in 1982, and with Yes, which Howe and keyboard player Geoff Downes had previously been members of. Dean updated the symbolic flying dragon and orb to 2012, which is the Year of the Water Dragon in the Chinese calendar. The title of the album features the Roman numeral XXX in commemoration of the 30th anniversary of the debut album.

Reception
XXX has received favorable reception from music critics and fans, with many hailing it as the group's best release since the 1980s. Matt Collar gave the album a rating of four-and-a-half stars out of five on AllMusic. "Bury Me in Willow", "No Religion" and "Face on the Bridge" were selected as three "Track Picks".

The album debuted at number 69 on the UK charts, peaking at the highest spot since Astra (1985). It reached number 33 in Germany and number 36 in Japan.

Track listing

Personnel

Asia
 John Wetton – vocals, bass guitar
 Steve Howe – electric, acoustic and steel guitars, backing vocals
 Geoff Downes – keyboards, backing vocals 
 Carl Palmer – drums, percussion

Technical personnel
 Mike Paxman – producer
 Steve Rispin – engineer
 Mark "Tufty" Evans – mixing engineer (at Wispington Studios, Cookham, Berkshire)
 Secondwave − mastering
 Roger Dean – illustration, logotype

Charts

Release history

References

Asia (band) albums
2012 albums
Frontiers Records albums
Albums produced by Mike Paxman
Albums with cover art by Roger Dean (artist)